So You Don't Know Korff Yet? (German: Nanu, Sie kennen Korff noch nicht?) is a 1938 German  comedy crime film directed by Fritz Holl and starring Heinz Rühmann, Victor Janson and Franz Schafheitlin. It was shot at the Babelsberg Studios in Berlin and on location in Mecklenburg and Holland. The film's sets were designed by the art directors Alfred Bütow and Willi Herrmann. It was produced and distributed by Terra Film, one of the leading film companies in Nazi Germany.

Synopsis
Unwittingly, the celebrated crime novelist Niels Korff has included details in his latest book that closely match the activities of a notorious pair of American criminals. They plan to assassinate him in Amsterdam, while also stealing a valuable Rubens painting. Yet all there schemes to kill him go wrong and he is ultimately able to turn the tables on them.

Cast
 Heinz Rühmann as Niels Korff
  Victor Janson as Dufour
  Franz Schafheitlin as Morton
  Fritz Rasp as Kelley
  Jakob Tiedtke as Vermeylen
  Senta Foltin as Dortje
  Agnes Straub as Philippine Schimmelpennick
  Will Dohm as van Gaalen
  Karl Meixner as Timor
  Viktor Bell as Jim
 Günther Lüders as 	Inspizient im 'Trocadero'
 Rudolf Platte as Regisseur im 'Trocadero' 
 Hubert von Meyerinck as 	Reporter Droste
 Josefine Dora as 	Wirtschafterin Antje 
 Oskar Höcker as 	Polizeikommissar

References

Bibliography
 Klaus, Ulrich J. Deutsche Tonfilme: Jahrgang 1938. Klaus-Archiv, 1988.

External links

1938 films
Films of Nazi Germany
1930s crime comedy films
German crime comedy films
1930s German-language films
German black-and-white films
1938 comedy films
1930s German films
Terra Film films
Films shot at Babelsberg Studios
Films shot in Berlin
Films shot in Amsterdam
Films set in Amsterdam